Macrotus is a genus of bats in the Neotropical family Phyllostomidae. This genus contains two species,  Macrotus californicus commonly known as California leaf-nosed bat and Macrotus waterhousii commonly known as Mexican or Waterhouse's leaf-nosed bat.  The range of this family includes the warmer parts of the southwestern United States, Mexico, Central and South America, and the Bahama Islands. Characteristic for the genus are large ears and the name giving triangular skin flap above the nose, the "leaf". The California Leaf-nosed Bat inhabits the arid deserts of the southwestern United States as far north as Nevada, south to Baja California and Sonora, Mexico. The California Leaf-nosed Bat is of medium size, with a total length between 9 and 11 cm  Its most distinctive features are the large ears, connected across the forehead. The body is pale grayish brown dorsally with whitish under parts. The pelage (fur) on the body is silky, the hairs on the back about 8 mm, on the front about 6 mm long. The posterior base of the ears are covered with hair of a woolly texture while the interior surface and most of the anterior border shows scattered long hairs. The flight membranes are thin and delicate; the wings are broad and the tail is slightly shorter that the long hind limbs and extends several millimeters beyond the uropatagium (see Bat). Macrotus waterhousii is also a big eared Bat which has ranges from Sonora to Hidalgo Mexico, south to Guatemala and the Greater Antilles (excluding Puerto Rico) and Bahamas. This species roosts primarily in caves, but also in mines and buildings. This species is also insectivorous (see insectivore), primarily consuming insects of the order Lepidoptera and Orthoptera. The mating and parturition times of M. waterhousii vary from island to island with 4–5 months gestation.

Macrotus californicus : Roosting Habits and Terrestrial Locomotion 
Macrotus has been mainly studied in the field in the Riverside Mountains of California. In the study area Macrotus roosts in the daytime exclusively in caves, deserted mine tunnels and deep grottos. They are usually within 30 to 80 feet of the entrance of the tunnel, and seemed not to require dark retreats. On many occasions leaf-nosed bats roost in tunnels less than 20 feet deep and fairly brightly lit. In order to be suitable the Macrotus retreat must be mostly enclosed and have overhead pro9tection from the weather. Roosting chambers are usually large enough to provide considerable ceiling surface and flying space, and thus adequate space allows the animal to find a place to roost while flying. The coolness of the roost also plays a factor in Macrotus selection of roosts, which is why Macrotus would choose to roost in a cool cave in the hot summers. Macrotus prefer to hang from sloping parts of the ceiling and actively grab the rock with ease due to the irregularity of the surface. the bat seems to rest much of the time while hanging onto the rock with only one foot. The free foot is often used for scratching and for grooming the fur, when the bat is engaged in these activities the body usually swings gently like an erratically disturbed pendulum.

Foraging Habits and Flight of Macrotus Californicus
The flight of the Macrotus Is remarkable chiefly for its extreme maneuverability. The bat flies fairly rapidly on occasion, but the usual foraging flight is slow and buoyant, and more nearly silent that of most bats. In level flight Macrotus wings make a soft fluttering sound that is less sharp and carrying than the sounds made by the wing beats of most other bats. The method of landing is most interesting. The bat flies six to eight inches below the ceiling and upon the wings making a deep down stroke that is directed nearly straight forward the hind limbs and uropatagium. These movements cause the bat to swoop upward toward the ceiling and as the bat nears the ceiling the wings are pulled back in an upstroke while the bat rolls over 180 degrees so that its back is facing downward and the long legs reach for the ceiling. Stated briefly, then the alighting maneuver consists of an upward swoop and a half-roll, at the end of which the feet wing rapidly toward the ceiling, seize it, and the wings give a final beat to steady the bat. Often these landings must require remarkably precise judgement of speed and distance, as many landings are made in the midst of a fairly closely spaced group of bats. Macrotus has two main methods of launching into flight, by dropping form the ceiling and taking flight after a short downward swoop, and by taking flight directly form the roosting place. The bat often hovers, both when foraging and when flying in its daytime retreat. Macrotus seems to hover easily, and it’s able to hover for several seconds at a time. These bats usually forage within three feet of the ground and often drop down closer to the ground nearer the surface where they can occasionally hover for a few seconds. Even bats released in the daytime flew fairly close to the ground. Leaf-nosed bats seem to be totally insectivorous, and their food clearly reflects the bats’ foraging habits. Some insects regularly eaten by Macrotus are almost certainly taken from the ground or from vegetation. The bats’ stomachs often contain orthopteran insects, noctuid moths and caterpillars, and beetles of the families Scarabaeidae and Carabidae, along with unidentified material. The lists of food items of Macrotus contain a plethora of insects that seldom fly, are flightless, or that fly in the daytime; this constitutes strong evidence that this bat consumes insects that are on the ground or on vegetation. Most leaf-nosed bats forage sometime between one hour after sundown and four hours after sundown, and then retire to a night roosting place. Actually, each bat seems to have a pre-midnight foraging period of roughly one hour. The greatest activity in the early morning seems to occur between two and one half hours before sunrise and thirty minutes before sunrise. Bats generally begin returning with full stomachs to their daytime roosts about two hours before sunrise, and the last bats usually return approximately twenty minutes before sunrise.

Effect of Diet on Basal Heat production
Insect feeders Insectivorous more closely resemble temperate zone taxa in their proclivity to relax thermoregulatory control when at rest and in their tendency to have lower basal metabolic rates. This apparently results form the fact that insectivorous species tend generally to be smaller and gain considerable metabolic savings by reducing body temperature ambient temperature differentials.

Aerodynamic considerations 
Most bats have lower wing loadings than do birds, and he mentioned that this difference may be due to the way bats forage. Most insectivorous birds forage by making repeated, short flights. Bats, on the other hand, remain on the wing for most if not all of the time they are foraging, and insects are captured by virtue of bats' ability to maneuver rapidly. In birds, the slots formed by the alula and primary flight feathers allow these animals to have high wing loadings and fairly low stalling speeds. In the unslotted wings of bats, the wings do not yield such refinements in flight characteristics, but within the size and wing loadings of bats there is little need for increasing lift. In comparison, the flight of bats is much is clearly less efficient than that of birds. The upstroke consumes relatively more power in bats than in birds because the wing surfaces in bats are continuous and do not allow the passage of air as do the spaces between the primaries of a bird.

Lift
Irregular membranes known as the propatagium (the membrane anterior to the humorous and radius) shape the wing.  The plagiopatagium (membrane posterior to the humorous)has  a greater surface than the chiropatagium (membranes between the digits), particularly the fifth, the position of the hind limb, which anchors the posterior edge of the plagiopatagium, and by the angles that the propatagium and dactylopatagium minus (membrane the second and third digits) make with the posterior parts of the wing membranes. Air pressure against the ventral surfaces of the wing membranes is greater than that against the dorsal surfaces; this helps to maintain a smoother camber. Macrotus californicus seems to spread its uropatagium widely only when hovering or performing other maneuvers requiring a departure form straight level flight, but the extreme maneuverability observed in Macrotus californicus is probably due to the specializations of its sensory equipment.

Osteology
In Macrotus the position of the hind limbs during level flight differs even more form that in most other mammals. The hind limbs are held behind the bat in a spider-leg- like posture, with the femur extending dorsad and caudad, and with the shank partially flexed and extending caudad and more or less downward.

Vertebral Column
The number of post cervical vertebrae in Macrotus are as follows: twelve thoracic, six lumbar, five sacral, seven caudal.

References

 
Bat genera
Taxa named by John Edward Gray
Taxonomy articles created by Polbot